Zoran "Čava" Dimitrijević (28 August 1962 – 13 September 2006) was a Serbian professional footballer who played as a midfielder.

Born in Belgrade, Dimitrijević started out at Partizan and made his first team debut in 1981. He spent four seasons in the senior squad, winning one Yugoslav First League title with the Crno-beli. After leaving the club in 1985, Dimitrijević moved to the United States and briefly played indoor soccer with the Kansas City Comets. He subsequently returned to Yugoslavia and went on to play for Spartak Subotica and Dinamo Zagreb. In his later years, Dimitrijević played for several French clubs.

He was the father of Miloš Dimitrijević.

Honours
Partizan
 Yugoslav First League: 1982–83
Spartak Subotica
 Yugoslav Second League: 1985–86

References

External links
 MISL stats
 

1962 births
2006 deaths
Footballers from Belgrade
ASOA Valence players
Association football midfielders
Dijon FCO players
ESA Brive players
Expatriate footballers in France
Expatriate soccer players in the United States
FK Partizan players
FK Spartak Subotica players
GNK Dinamo Zagreb players
Kansas City Comets (original MISL) players
Ligue 2 players
Major Indoor Soccer League (1978–1992) players
Serbian footballers
Yugoslav expatriate footballers
Yugoslav footballers
Yugoslav expatriate sportspeople in France
Yugoslav expatriate sportspeople in the United States
Yugoslav First League players
Yugoslavia under-21 international footballers
Burials at Belgrade New Cemetery